Afdiharto Mardi Lestari (born 19 January 1968, in Binjai) is a retired Indonesian athlete who competed in sprinting events. His biggest success was reaching the semifinals in the 100 metres at the 1988 Summer Olympics in Seoul. In addition, he won multiple medals on regional level.

International competitions

1Representing Asia

Personal bests
Outdoor
100 metres – 10.20 (Jakarta 1989)
200 metres – 21.00 (+1.1 m/s, Kuala Lumpur 1989)

References

All-Athletics profile

1968 births
Living people
People from Binjai
Indonesian male sprinters
Olympic athletes of Indonesia
Athletes (track and field) at the 1988 Summer Olympics
Sportspeople from North Sumatra
Southeast Asian Games medalists in athletics
Southeast Asian Games gold medalists for Indonesia
Southeast Asian Games silver medalists for Indonesia
Athletes (track and field) at the 1994 Asian Games
Competitors at the 1987 Southeast Asian Games
Competitors at the 1989 Southeast Asian Games
Competitors at the 1991 Southeast Asian Games
Competitors at the 1993 Southeast Asian Games
Asian Games competitors for Indonesia
20th-century Indonesian people